Clifton Avon "Cliff" Edwards (June 14, 1895 – July 17, 1971), nicknamed "Ukulele Ike", was an American musician and actor. He enjoyed considerable popularity in the 1920s and early 1930s, specializing in jazzy renditions of pop standards and novelty tunes. He had a number one hit with "Singin' in the Rain" in 1929. He also did voices for animated cartoons later in his career, and he is best known as the voice of Jiminy Cricket in Walt Disney's Pinocchio (1940) and Fun and Fancy Free (1947), and Dandy (Jim) Crow in Walt Disney's Dumbo (1941).

Early life and musical career
Edwards was born in Hannibal, Missouri. He left school at age 14 and soon moved to St. Louis, Missouri, and Saint Charles, Missouri, where he entertained as a singer in saloons. As many places had pianos in bad shape or none at all, Edwards taught himself to play ukulele to serve as his own accompanist (choosing it because it was the cheapest instrument in the music shop). He was nicknamed "Ukulele Ike" by a club owner who could never remember his name. He got his first break in 1918 at the Arsonia Cafe in Chicago, Illinois, where he performed a song called "Ja-Da", written by the club's pianist, Bob Carleton. Edwards and Carleton made it a hit on the vaudeville circuit. Vaudeville headliner Joe Frisco hired Edwards as part of his act, which was featured at the Palace in New York City—the most prestigious vaudeville theater—and later in the Ziegfeld Follies.

Edwards made his first phonograph records in 1919. He recorded early examples of jazz scat singing in 1922. The following year he signed a contract with Pathé Records. He became one of the most popular singers of the 1920s, appearing in several Broadway shows. He recorded many of the pop and novelty hits of the day, including "California, Here I Come", "Hard Hearted Hannah", "Yes Sir, That's My Baby", and "I'll See You in My Dreams".

In 1924, Edwards performed as the headliner at the Palace, the pinnacle of his vaudeville success. That year he also featured in George and Ira Gershwin's first Broadway musical Lady Be Good, alongside Fred and Adele Astaire. As a recording artist, his hits included "Paddlin’ Madeleine Home" (1925), "I Can't Give You Anything but Love" (1928), and the classic "Singin' in the Rain" (1929), which he introduced. Edwards's own compositions included "(I'm Cryin' 'Cause I Know I'm) Losing You", "You're So Cute (Mama o' Mine)", "Little Somebody of Mine", and "I Want to Call You 'Sweet Mama'". He also recorded a few "off-color" novelty songs for under-the-counter sales, including "I'm a Bear in a Lady's Boudoir", "Take Out That Thing", and "Give It to Mary with Love".

Edwards, more than any other performer, was responsible for the soaring popularity of the ukulele.
Millions of ukuleles were sold during the decade, and Tin Pan Alley publishers added ukulele chords to standard sheet music. Edwards always played American Martin ukuleles, favoring the small soprano model in his early career. In his later years, he moved to the larger tenor ukulele, which was becoming popular in the 1930s.

Edwards continued to record until shortly before his death in 1971. His last record album, Ukulele Ike, was released posthumously on the independent Glendale label. He reprised many of his 1920s hits; his failing health was however evident in the recordings.

Film, radio, and television
In 1929, Cliff Edwards was playing at the Orpheum Theater in Los Angeles where he caught the attention of movie producer-director Irving Thalberg. His film company Metro-Goldwyn-Mayer hired Edwards to appear in early sound movies. After performing in some short films, Edwards was one of the stars in the feature Hollywood Revue of 1929, doing some comic bits and singing some numbers, including the film debut of his hit "Singin' in the Rain". He appeared in a total of 33 films for MGM through 1933. He had a small role as Mike, playing a ukulele very briefly at the beginning of the 1931 movie Laughing Sinners (1931), starring Joan Crawford.

Edwards had a friendly working relationship with MGM's comedy star Buster Keaton, who featured Edwards in three of his films. Keaton, himself a former vaudevillian, enjoyed singing and harmonized with Edwards between takes. One of these casual jam sessions was captured on film, in Doughboys (1930), in which Buster and Cliff scat-sing their way through "You Never Did That Before".

Edwards was also an occasional supporting player in feature films and short subjects at Warner Bros. and RKO Radio Pictures. He played a wisecracking sidekick to western star George O'Brien, and he filled in for Allen Jenkins as "Goldie" opposite Tom Conway in The Falcon Strikes Back. In a 1940 short, he led a cowboy chorus in Cliff Edwards and His Buckaroos. Throughout the 1940s he appeared in a number of "B" westerns playing the comic, singing sidekick to the hero, seven times with Charles Starrett and six with Tim Holt.

Edwards appeared in the darkly sardonic western comedy The Bad Man of Brimstone (1937), and he played the character "Endicott" in the screwball comedy film His Girl Friday (1940). In 1939, he voiced the off-screen wounded Confederate soldier in Gone with the Wind in a hospital scene with Vivien Leigh and Olivia de Havilland.

His most famous voice role was as Jiminy Cricket in Walt Disney's Pinocchio (1940). Edwards's rendition of "When You Wish Upon a Star" is probably his most familiar recorded legacy. He voiced the head crow in Disney's Dumbo (1941) and sang "When I See an Elephant Fly".

In 1932, Edwards had his first national radio show on CBS Radio. He continued hosting network radio shows through 1946. In the early 1930s, however, Edwards' popularity faded as public taste shifted to crooners such as Russ Columbo, Rudy Vallee, and Bing Crosby.

Arthur Godfrey's use of the ukulele spurred a surge in its popularity and those that played it, including Edwards. Like many vaudeville stars, Edwards was an early arrival on television. In the 1949 season, he starred in The Cliff Edwards Show, a three-days-a-week (Monday, Wednesday, and Friday evenings) TV variety show on CBS. In the 1950s and early 1960s, he made appearances on The Mickey Mouse Club, in addition to performing his Jiminy Cricket voice for various Disney shorts and the Disney Christmas spectacular, From All of Us to All of You.

Personal life
Edwards was careless with the money he made in the 1920s, always trying to sustain his expensive habits and lifestyle. He continued working during the Great Depression, but never again enjoyed his former prosperity. Most of his income went to alimony for his three former wives, and paying debts, and he declared bankruptcy four times during the 1930s and early 1940s. Edwards married his first wife Gertrude (Benson) Ryrholm in 1917, but they divorced four years later. He married Irene Wylie in 1923; they divorced in 1931. In 1932, he married his third and final wife, actress Judith Barrett. They divorced in 1936.

As well as being a lifelong heavy tobacco smoker, Edwards also struggled with alcoholism, drug addiction and gambling for much of his career.

Later years and death
In his final years, Edwards lived in a home for indigent actors and often spent his time at the Walt Disney Studios to be available any time he could get voice work. He was sometimes taken to lunch by animators whom he befriended and told stories of his days in vaudeville.

On July 17, 1971, Cliff Edwards died in a nursing home in Hollywood, Los Angeles at age 76 from a cardiac arrest brought on by arteriosclerosis. Now penniless, Edwards was a charity patient at the Virgil Convalescent Hospital in Hollywood, California. His body was unclaimed and was donated to the University of California, Los Angeles medical school. When Walt Disney Productions, which had been quietly paying many of his medical expenses, discovered this, they offered to purchase his remains and pay for the burial. Instead, it was done by the Actors' Fund of America (which had also aided Edwards) and the Motion Picture and Television Relief Fund. Disney paid for his grave marker.

Honors
 
In 2002, Edwards' 1940 recording on Victor, Victor 26477, "When You Wish Upon a Star", was inducted into the Grammy Hall of Fame. In 2000, Edwards was awarded as a Disney Legend for voice-acting.

Discography
 Ukulele Ike Sings Again (Disneyland, 1956)
 A Day at Disneyland with Walt Disney and Jiminy Cricket (Disneyland, 1957)
 The Story of Walt Disney's Cinderella (Disneyland, 1957)
 Songs, Games & Fun (RCA Victor, 1958)
 Ukulele Ike (Glendale, 1978)
 Cliff Edwards and His Hot Combination 1925–1926 (Retrieval, 1978)
 The Vintage Recordings of Cliff Edwards (Ukulele Ike) (Take Two, 1979)
 The Musical Score of The Wizard of Oz/The Song Hits from Walt Disney's Pinocchio (MCA, 1980)
 Ukulele Ike 1930's Radio Transcriptions: Live June 1947 (Collectors' Choice, 1996)

Partial filmography

 Marianne (1929) as Soapy
 So This Is College (1929) as Windy
 The Hollywood Revue of 1929 (1929) as Himself 
 They Learned About Women (1930) as Singer in Harlem Madness number (uncredited)
 Lord Byron of Broadway (1930) as Joe
 Crazy House (1930, Short) as Writer
 Doughboys (1930) as Nescopeck
 Montana Moon (1930) as Froggy
 Children of Pleasure (1930) as Cliff - Radio Performer (uncredited)
 Way Out West (1930) as Trilby
 Good News (1930) as Kearney
 Those Three French Girls (1930) as Owly
 Remote Control (1930) as Hog Caller (uncredited)
 Dance, Fools, Dance (1931) as Bert Scranton
 The Prodigal (1931) as Snipe, a Tramp
 Parlor, Bedroom and Bath (1931) as Bell Hop
 Stepping Out (1931) as Paul Perkins
 Shipmates (1931) as Bilge
 Laughing Sinners (1931) as Mike
 The Great Lover (1931) as Finny
 Sidewalks of New York (1931) as Poggle
 The Sin of Madelon Claudet (1931) as Victor Lebeau
 Hell Divers (1931) as "Baldy"
 Young Bride (1932) as Pete
 Fast Life (1932) as Bumpy
 Flying Devils (1933) as 'Screwy' Edwards
 Take a Chance (1933) as Louie Webb
 George White's Scandals (1934) as Stew Hart
 George White's 1935 Scandals (1935) as Dude
 Red Salute (1935) as P.J. Rooney
 The Man I Marry (1936) as Jerry Ridgeway
 They Gave Him a Gun (1937) as Laro
 Between Two Women (1937) as Snoopy
 Saratoga (1937) as Tip
 Bad Guy (1937) as 'Hi-Line'
 The Women Men Marry (1937) as Jerry Little
 The Bad Man of Brimstone (1937) as 'Buzz' McCreedy
 Big City (1937)
 The Girl of the Golden West (1938) as Minstrel Joe
 The Little Adventuress (1938) as Handy
 Maisie (1939) as 'Shorty' Miller
 Smuggled Cargo (1939) as Professor 
 Gone with the Wind (1939) as Reminiscent Soldier
 His Girl Friday (1940) as Reporter Endicott
 High School (1940) as Jeff Jefferson
 Pinocchio (1940) as Jiminy Cricket (voice, uncredited)
 Millionaires in Prison (1940) as Happy
 Flowing Gold (1940) as 'Hot Rocks' Harris
 Cliff Edwards and His Buckaroos (1940) as "Mr. Cliff" (Western short)
 Friendly Neighbors (1940) as Notes
 She Couldn't Say No (1940) as Banjo Page
 The Monster and the Girl (1941) as Leon Beecher 'Tips' Stokes
 Knockout (1941) as Pinky (credits) / Sleepy
 Power Dive (1941) as Squid Watkins
 International Squadron (1941) as Omaha McGrath
 Dumbo (1941) as Dandy Crow (voice, uncredited)
 Sundown Jim (1942) as Stable proprietor
 Bandit Ranger (1942) as Ike
 Red River Robin Hood (1942) as Ike
 Seven Miles from Alcatraz (1942) as Stormy
 Pirates of the Prairie (1942) as Ike 
 American Empire (1942) as Runty
 Der Fuehrer's Face (1943) as Nazi lead singer
 Fighting Frontier (1943) as Ike 
 Salute for Three (1943) as Foggy
 The Falcon Strikes Back (1943) as Goldie Locke
 Sagebrush Law (1943) as Ike
 The Avenging Rider (1943) as Ike
 Fun and Fancy Free (1947) as Jiminy Cricket (voice)
 Bat Masterson (1959) as AJ Mulvaney - Town Undertaker 
 Platinum High School (1960) as Frank (uncredited)
 The Man from Button Willow (1965) as Doc / The Whip (voice, uncredited)

References

Further reading
 The Cliff Edwards Discography by Larry F. Kiner, Greenwood Press, New York, 1987.  Contains a short biography, an extensive discography, and listing of his film, radio, and television appearances.

External links

 
 
 Cliff Edwards extensive fan site by David Garrick
Clifton Avon "Cliff" Edwards bio on ragtimepiano.com
 Cliff Edwards "Ukulele Ike" on RedHotJazz.com, with .ram files of his vintage recordings.

1895 births
1971 deaths
American street performers
American crooners
American jazz singers
American male pop singers
American male voice actors
People from Hannibal, Missouri
Male actors from St. Louis
RCA Victor artists
American ukulele players
Vaudeville performers
Scat singers
20th-century American male actors
Burials at Valhalla Memorial Park Cemetery
20th-century American singers
Jazz musicians from Missouri
20th-century American male singers